The 1889 Washington gubernatorial election took place on October 1, 1889, to elect the first Governor of Washington shortly before it was admitted as a U.S. state. Both candidates, Republican Elisha P. Ferry and Democrat Eugene Semple, previously served as Territorial Governor, a position appointed by the President of the United States.

Ferry won the election by nearly 9,000 votes out of 58,000 cast, and took office in Olympia on November 18, 1889, a week after President Benjamin Harrison signed Washington's statehood into law.

General election

Results

County results

References

1889
1889 United States gubernatorial elections
Gubernatorial
October 1889 events